The 1975 Cincinnati Bearcats football team represented University of Cincinnati during 1975 NCAA Division I football season.

Schedule

Roster

Game Films
1975 Cincinnati - Maryland Football Game Film

References

Cincinnati
Cincinnati Bearcats football seasons
Cincinnati Bearcats football